Rear Admiral Sir Adolphus Augustus Frederick FitzGeorge  (30 January 1846 – 17 December 1922) was a senior officer of the Royal Navy.

Biography

Adolphus FitzGeorge was born 30 January 1846, the second son of Prince George, Duke of Cambridge and the actress Sarah Fairbrother. His parents subsequently went through a form of marriage in contravention of the Royal Marriages Act 1772, when his mother was pregnant with his youngest brother. Neither he nor his brothers, George FitzGeorge and Augustus FitzGeorge, held royal titles, and were ineligible to succeed to the Dukedom of Cambridge.

Adolphus entered the Royal Navy in March 1859. He became sub-lieutenant in 1865, and a lieutenant in the following year. In June 1867, he joined the Galatea, screw frigate, commanded by Captain the Duke of Edinburgh, and in March 1872, was appointed Flag Lieutenant to Admiral Sir Rodney Mundy, Commander-in-Chief, Portsmouth. On 30 November 1872, he was promoted to commander. Following a period at the Royal Naval College, he became Inspecting Officer of Coastguard at Scarborough in February 1874, and in September of the next year, was given command of the sloop Rapid in the Mediterranean. Other commands he held were those of the Dasher, paddle gun-vessel, stationed off the Channel Islands; and the Salamis, dispatch vessel, in the Channel Squadron, from the latter of which he was promoted captain on 14 October 1881. In March 1885, he became captain of the troopship Jumna, in the transport service to India, and his two years or more in this command marked the limit of his active naval employment. He retired on 1 January 1893, and was advanced to rear admiral on the retired list on 20 October 1896. On leaving the Navy he received the appointment of Deputy Ranger of Richmond Park. For many years he acted as equerry to his father, and in 1904, the year in which the Duke died, he was gazetted a Knight Commander of the Royal Victorian Order.

Adolphus married, on 21 September 1875 in Kingston upon Hull, Sophia Jane Holden (2 April 1857 – 3 February 1920), the daughter of Mr. Thomas Holden, of Winstead Hall, Hull, by whom he had one daughter, Olga FitzGeorge. Following the death of the first Lady FitzGeorge, the Admiral married, on 28 October 1920 in London, Marguerite Beatrice Daisy Watson (14 April 1863 – 26 February 1934), daughter of John Watson, of Waresley Court, Hartlebury, Worcestershire.

Sir Adolphus died 17 December 1922 at his residence, 20 Eccleston Square, London.

Issue

Ancestry

References
Sir Adolphus Fitz George Career in the Navy, The Times, 18 December 1922; p. 14.

1846 births
1922 deaths
Illegitimate children of British princes
Adolphus FitzGeorge
Knights Commander of the Royal Victorian Order
Military personnel from London
People from Pimlico
Royal Navy rear admirals